The following is a list of memorials to and things named in honor of Albert Gallatin.

Honors

 Gallatin's portrait was on the front of the $500 United States Note issued in 1862–63.
 Gallatin's portrait was on the regular issue Prominent Americans series ¢ postage stamp from 1967 to 1973.
 Friendship Hill National Historic Site, a  estate which includes the beautifully restored home of Albert Gallatin, is run by the National Park Service and is located in Fayette County, Pa. It is open to the public.
 The United States Department of the Treasury's highest career service award is named the Albert Gallatin Award in his honor.
 There is a bronze statue of Albert Gallatin by James Earle Fraser located in front of the northern entrance of the Treasury Building.
 250-ton U.S. Revenue Cutter Albert Gallatin, built in 1871 and lost in 1892.
 Elected a member of the American Antiquarian Society in 1836.

Counties

 Gallatin County, Illinois
 Gallatin County, Kentucky
 Gallatin County, Montana
 Gallatin National Forest, Montana
 Gallatin River, Montana
 Gallatin Range, Montana

Towns
 Gallatin, Missouri
 Gallatin Gateway, Montana
 Gallatin, Tennessee
 Gallatin, Rusk County, Texas
 Town of Gallatin, Columbia County, New York
 Village of Gallatin, Nicholson Township, Fayette County, Pennsylvania

Roads and Bridges 
 Albert Gallatin Memorial Bridge - a now-demolished bridge over the Monongahela River that connected Point Marion in Fayette County, Pennsylvania and Dunkard Township in Greene County, Pennsylvania.
 Gallatin Pike in East Nashville, Tennessee
 Gallatin Street in Washington, D.C.
 Gallatin Street in Jackson, Mississippi
 Gallatin Street in Providence, Rhode Island
 Gallatin Street in Vandalia, Illinois
 Gallatin Road in Pico Rivera, California
 Gallatin Road (formerly Gallatin School House Road) in Downey, California
 Gallatin Avenue, Uniontown, Fayette County, Pennsylvania
 Avenue de Gallatin in Geneva, Switzerland

Academia
 A school district in Fayette County, Pennsylvania (in which his home Friendship Hill is located) is named the Albert Gallatin Area School District in his honor.
 The Gallatin School of Individualized Study at New York University honors his participation in the founding of the university.
 The ALBERT student information system at New York University is named for him.
 Gallatin Elementary School in Downey, California
 Gallatin Hall at Harvard Business School in Boston, Massachusetts
 Gallatin Hall at Robert Morris University in Pittsburgh, Pennsylvania

References

Gallatin, Albert
Gallatin, Albert